Kerry Jewel is a British theatre producer. He has produced a large number of shows in collaboration with his wife Elyse, notably Pan, an adaptation of Peter Pan.

He had two sons, Dean and Dale. Dale died in 1998 in an accident working on a production of the Rocky Horror Picture Show.

References

External links
Biography at Brand Yourself

British theatre people
Living people
1947 births